The Metropolitanate of Dabar-Bosnia is a metropolis of the Serbian Orthodox Church in Bosnia and Herzegovina, seated in Sarajevo. Since 2017, Metropolitan of Dabar and Bosnia is Hrizostom Jević.

History
The medieval Eparchy of Dabar was founded in 1219 by the first Serbian archbishop, Saint Sava. The seat of bishops of Dabar was in the Banja Monastery near Priboj. Eparchy of Dabar had jurisdiction over the region of lower Lim and middle Drina on the borders with medieval Bosnia.

In 1557, Serbian Patriarchate of Peć was restored and the Eparchy of Dabar and Bosnia was returned to its jurisdiction, with its bishops of holding the honorary title of metropolitan. In 1766, when the autocephalous Serbian Patriarchate of Peć was abolished, Eparchy of Dabar-Bosnia and all other Serbian eparchies under Ottoman rule came under the jurisdiction of Ecumenical Patriarchate of Constantinople. Bishop of Dabar-Bosnia kept his honorary title of metropolitan, as was also the custom in the Ecumenical Patriarchate. The seat of metropolitan was in Sarajevo.

Since the 1878 campaign, Bosnia and Herzegovina was ruled by Austria-Hungary, but under the Convention of 1880 all Eastern Orthodox eparchies remained under ecclesiastical jurisdiction of Ecumenical Patriarchate of Constantinople. 

At the end of the First World War in 1918, all Eastern Orthodox bishops in Bosnia and Herzegovina reached a unanimous decision to join with other Serbian ecclesiastical provinces into united Serbian Orthodox Church. The process of unification was completed in 1920 and since then Eparchy of Dabar-Bosnia remains part of the united Serbian Orthodox Church.

From 2015 to 2017, the diocese was administered by Bishop Grigorije (Durić) of Zahumlje and Herzegovina.

Bishops

Annotations
It is known in English as the Metropolitanate of Dabar-Bosna or Metropolitanate of Dabar-Bosnia. It is scarcely known as the Metropolitanate of Dabar and Bosnia. It was formerly unofficially known as the Metropolitanate of Sarajevo (Сарајевска митрополија).

See also
Eastern Orthodoxy in Bosnia and Herzegovina
Serbs of Bosnia and Herzegovina
List of the Eparchies of the Serbian Orthodox Church

References

Sources

External links

Religious sees of the Serbian Orthodox Church
Serbian Orthodox Church in Bosnia and Herzegovina
Religion in Republika Srpska
1219 establishments in Europe
Religious organizations established in the 1210s
Dioceses established in the 13th century